Parastrigea is a genus of trematodes in the family Strigeidae.

Species
Parastrigea brasiliana (Ukoli, 1967)
Parastrigea buffoni Drago, Núñez & Lunaschi, 2018
Parastrigea cincta Brandes, 1888
Parastrigea diovadena Dubois & Macko, 1972
Parastrigea plataleae Hernández-Mena, García-Prieto & García-Varela, 2014

References

Diplostomida
Digenea genera